Baharestan is the Iranian parliament building.

Baharestan, also rendered as Bahristan may also refer to:

Places

Afghanistan
 Baharestan, Afghanistan, a village in Badakhshan Province

Iran
 Baharestan, Fars, a village
 Baharestan, Gilan, a village
 Baharestan, Isfahan, a city in Isfahan Province
 Baharestan Rural District, in Isfahan Province
 Baharestan, Rafsanjan, a village in Kerman Province
 Baharestan, Zarand, a village in Kerman Province
 Baharestan, Kurdistan, a village
 Baharestan, Ashtian, a village in Markazi Province
 Baharestan, Farahan, a village in Markazi Province
 Baharestan, Khondab, a village in Markazi Province
 Baharestan, Mazandaran, a village
 Baharestan, Razavi Khorasan, a village
 Baharestan, South Khorasan, a village
 Baharestan (district), a district of Tehran
 Baharestan County, a county in Tehran Province
 Baharestan Metro Station, a station in Tehran Metro Line 2

Other uses
 Baharestan (book), a Persian book by Jami
 Baharestan (newspaper), an Iranian newspaper of the Fars region
 Baharestan Carpet, a style of Persian carpet